Laphystia is a genus of robber flies in the family Asilidae. There are at least 50 described species in Laphystia.

Species
These 56 species belong to the genus Laphystia:

 Laphystia actius (Melander, 1923) i c g
 Laphystia aegyptiaca Efflatoun, 1937 c g
 Laphystia albicans Engel, 1932 c g
 Laphystia albiceps (Macquart, 1846) i c g
 Laphystia alpheia Janssens, 1958 c g
 Laphystia anatolica (Hermann, 1920) c g
 Laphystia annulata Hull, 1957 i c g
 Laphystia bromleyi Wilcox, 1960 i c g
 Laphystia brookmani Wilcox, 1960 i c g
 Laphystia canadensis Curran, 1927 i c g
 Laphystia carnea Hermann, 1906 c g
 Laphystia cazieri Wilcox, 1960 i c g
 Laphystia columbina Schiner, 1868 c g
 Laphystia confusa Curran, 1927 i c g
 Laphystia dimidiata Oldroyd, 1958 c g
 Laphystia duncani Wilcox, 1960 i c g
 Laphystia erberi Schiner, 1866 c g
 Laphystia fasciata (Lynch Arribalzaga, 1880) c g
 Laphystia flavipes Coquillett, 1904 i c g b
 Laphystia francoisi Janssens, 1966 c g
 Laphystia gigantella (Loew, 1852) c g
 Laphystia hispanica Strobl, 1906 c g
 Laphystia howlandi Wilcox, 1960 i c g
 Laphystia jamesi Wilcox, 1960 i c g
 Laphystia kazaka Lehr, 1969 c g
 Laphystia kuehlhorni Janssens, 1961 c g
 Laphystia laguna Wilcox, 1960 i c g
 Laphystia lanhami James, 1941 i c g
 Laphystia latiuscula Loew, 1871 c g
 Laphystia lehri Abbassian-Lintzen, 1964 c g
 Laphystia limatula Coquillett, 1904 i c g
 Laphystia litoralis Curran, 1931 i c g b
 Laphystia martini Wilcox, 1960 i c g
 Laphystia notata (Bigot, 1878) i c g b
 Laphystia ochreifrons Curran, 1931 i c g b
 Laphystia opaca Coquillett, 1904 i c g
 Laphystia pilamensis Hradsky, 1983 c g
 Laphystia robusta Hermann, 1908 c g
 Laphystia rubra Hull, 1957 i c g
 Laphystia rufiventris Curran, 1931 i c g
 Laphystia rufofasciata Curran, 1931 i c g
 Laphystia sabulicola Loew, 1847 c g
 Laphystia schnusei Hermann, 1908 c g
 Laphystia selenis Paramonov, 1930 c g
 Laphystia setosa Theodor, 1980 c g
 Laphystia sexfasciata (Say, 1823) i g
 Laphystia sillersi Hull, 1963 i c g
 Laphystia snowi Wilcox, 1960 i c g
 Laphystia sonora Wilcox, 1960 c g
 Laphystia stigmaticallis Bigot, 1878 c g
 Laphystia texensis Curran, 1931 i c g b
 Laphystia tolandi Wilcox, 1960 i c g
 Laphystia tollandi b
 Laphystia torpida Hull, 1957 i c g
 Laphystia utahensis Wilcox, 1960 i c g
 Laphystia varipes Curran, 1931 i c g

Data sources: i = ITIS, c = Catalogue of Life, g = GBIF, b = Bugguide.net

References

Further reading

 
 
 

 
Asilidae genera
Articles created by Qbugbot